Slip or SLIP may refer to:

Science and technology

Biology
 Slip (fish), also known as Black Sole
 Slip (horticulture), a small cutting of a plant as a specimen or for grafting
 Muscle slip, a branching of a muscle, in anatomy

Computing and telecommunications
 SLIP (programming language), (Symmetric LIst Processing language)
 Slip (telecommunication), a positional displacement in a sequence of transmitted symbols
 Serial Line Internet Protocol, a mostly obsolete encapsulation of the Internet Protocol

Earth science
 Silicic-dominated Large Igneous Province (SLIP), a geological feature consisting of a large area of igneous rocks of a certain type
 Slip, the relative movement of geological features present on either side of a fault plane
 Land slip or landslide, commonly called a slip in New Zealand

Materials
 Slip (ceramics), an aqueous suspension of minerals
 Slip (materials science), the process by which a dislocation motion produces plastic deformation

Mechanical systems
 Slip (vehicle dynamics), the relative motion between a tire and the road surface
 Slip, the difference in speed between the frequency supplied to an induction motor and rotor shaft speed
 Slip, a type of rail switch
 Slip gauge or gauge block, a system for producing precision lengths

Psychology
 Slip (treatment), a temporary return to a negative behavior after therapy intended to correct that behavior
 Freudian slip, an error in speech, memory or physical action that arises from the unconscious mind

Other uses in science and technology
 Slip (aerodynamics), an aerodynamic state in which an aircraft is moving sideways as well as forward relative to the oncoming airflow
 Slipway, a ramp on the shore by which ships or boats can be moved to and from the water

Music
 The Slip (band), a rock band
 Slip (album), a 1993 album by the band Quicksand
 The Slip (album) (2008), a.k.a. Halo 27, the seventh studio album by Nine Inch Nails
 "Slip" (song), a 2013 song by Stooshe 
 "Slip", a song by Linkin Park from LP Underground 11
 "Slip", a song by Shawn Austin from the 2022 extended play Planes Don't Wait

Nickname
 Slip Carr (1899–1971), Australian rugby union player and Olympic sprinter
 Slip Madigan (1896–1966), American college football player and multi-sport college coach

Other uses
 Slip (clothing), a woman's underdress or underskirt
 Slip (cricket), a fielding position in cricket
 Slip (needlework), an embroidered or appliqued image of a plant-cutting
 Ferry slip, a specialized docking facility that receives a ferryboat
 Packing slip, a shipping document that accompanies delivery packages
 Slip opinion, a kind of judicial opinion, published on the day of the decision and subject to later revision
 "Slip" (Better Call Saul), an episode of Better Call Saul
 The Slip, a section of Swansea Beach

See also
 
 Slippage (disambiguation)
 Slippery (disambiguation)

Lists of people by nickname